Phosphoinositide 3-kinase adapter protein 1 is an enzyme that in humans is encoded by the PIK3AP1 gene.

References

Further reading